Rockport Generating Station is a coal-fired power plant, located along the Ohio River in Ohio Township, Spencer County, Indiana, in the United States, near Rockport. The power plant is located along U.S. Route 231 (segment known as the Abraham Lincoln Memorial Parkway), approximately one mile north of the William H. Natcher Bridge, spanning the Ohio River. It is operated by Indiana Michigan Power, a subsidiary of American Electric Power.

History
Two identical non-cyclonic Babcock & Wilcox units (1,300 MW each) were launched into service in December 1984 and December 1988. They are among the largest coal units built. The plant is connected to the grid by 765 kilovolt transmission lines (the highest rated voltage used in the United States).

Coal supply
The coal is delivered to the plant by barges along the Ohio River. The plant burns in excess of seven million short tons of coal a year. To minimize cost, AEP announced in February 2018 that Rockport will rely solely on coal from the Powder River Basin in Wyoming.

Retirement
In July 2019, AEP announced that Rockport's Unit 1 will retire by the end of 2028. This was made in an agreement modification between AEP, the United States Environmental Protection Agency (EPA), several northeastern states, the Sierra Club, and other parties. The agreement allows AEP to achieve emission reduction goals while also shutting down Unit 1 without adding costly pollution control systems.

In April, 2021  AEP announced that Rockport's Unit 2 will also be retired by the end of 2028.

See also

 List of largest power stations in the United States
 List of power stations in Indiana
 List of tallest chimneys in the world

References

External links
Chimney Diagram

Energy infrastructure completed in 1984
Towers completed in 1984
Energy infrastructure completed in 1989
Towers in Indiana
Coal-fired power stations in Indiana
Buildings and structures in Spencer County, Indiana
Southwestern Indiana
Chimneys in the United States
American Electric Power